The New Zealand Book Awards for Children and Young Adults are a series of literary awards presented annually to recognise excellence in children and young adult's literature in New Zealand.

History
The awards began in 1982, as the New Zealand Government Publishing Awards, with two categories, Children's Book of the Year and Picture Book of the Year. A non-fiction award was presented in 1986, but not in 1987 or 1988, the final years of this incarnation of the awards.

No awards were presented in 1989, but in 1990, Unilever New Zealand (then the New Zealand manufacturer of Aim toothpaste) restarted them as the AIM Children's Book Awards.  with the two categories, Fiction, and Picture Book. Second and third prizes were originally awarded, though these were replaced with honour awards in 1993, presented at the judges' discretion. More categories were added over time: Best First Book in 1992 (not presented 1994–5); Non-Fiction in 1993, when Fiction was split into two categories (Senior Fiction and Junior Fiction); and AIM Book of the Year in 1995.

In 1997, the awards became the New Zealand Post Children's Book Awards, and another new category was added, the New Zealand Post Children's Choice award.

In 2004, the Senior Fiction category was renamed to Young Adult Fiction and the name changed to New Zealand Post Book Awards for Children and Young Adults.

In April 2013 the award's name was changed to honour the late New Zealand children's author Margaret Mahy, and became known as the New Zealand Post Margaret Mahy Book of the Year awards.

The awards were in 2015 changed to the New Zealand Book Awards for Children and Young Adults and were administered by Booksellers New Zealand, an industry organisation, and presented at the end of a 10-day festival organised by the New Zealand Book Council each May.

In 2016, the Awards merged with the Library and Information Association of New Zealand Aotearoa (LIANZA) Awards, and are  administered by the New Zealand Book Awards Trust.

Prizes
, the winners of the Picture Book, Junior Fiction, Young Adult Fiction, and Non-Fiction categories are awarded , with the New Zealand Post Margaret Mahy Book of the Year winner receiving an additional $7,500. The Picture Book prize money is split evenly between the author and the illustrator of the book. Winners of the Best First Book and New Zealand Post Children's Choice awards receive $2,000 each, and any finalists presented an Honour Award receive $500 each.

Awards

Children's Book of the Year
Now called the New Zealand Post Margaret Mahy Book of the Year, this award is presented to a book "which, in the opinion of the judges, achieves outstanding excellence in all general judging criteria". , winners receive $7,500 (in addition to the $7,500 prize for winning in their category). Currently called the New Zealand Post Children's Book of the Year award, this award was originally known as the New Zealand Children's Book of the Year Award, presented from 1982 to 1988. When the New Zealand Government Publishing Awards finished in 1988, the award ceased to exist until 1995, when the AIM Children's Book Awards established the AIM Book of the Year.

Winners of the Fiction category in 1990 to 1992, when there was no Book of the Year award and the only additional category was Picture Book (and Best First Book in 1992), have been considered Book of the Year winners.

New Zealand Children's Book of the Year Award (1982–8); AIM Book of the Year (1995–6); New Zealand Post Children's Book of the Year (1997–)

Children's Choice
In 2015 for the first time, children chose the finalist list for the Children's Choice awards. With 6,000 students putting their votes in for all 149 of the titles submitted for the awards, the finalists were announced on 9 June. This began the second stage of voting, which saw just under 16,000 students post their votes for the Children's Choice winners.

Until 2014, the Children's Choice award was chosen from the finalists in all categories below by a public vote open to school aged children, and is considered one of the highest accolades in the awards.  winners of the Children's Choice award receive a prize of $2,000.

The Children's Choice award was created at the first New Zealand Post Children's Book Awards in 1997, and has been presented every year since. Despite being open to finalists from all categories,  all winners have been from the Picture Book category. From 2010 the winners of each category have also been announced.

NB: Overall Children's Choice award winners not included.

Best First Book
The Best First Book award is open to entrants in any of the categories below who are first‐time authors. , winners in of the Best First Book award receive a prize of $2,000.

The Best First Book category was first included in the AIM Children's Book Awards in 1992, but was not awarded 1994–5. Since then, the award has been presented every year except 2001.

Best First Book (1992–3, 1996–2000, 2002–)

Categories

Picture Book
The Picture Book category is for titles in which the illustrations "carry the impact of the story" along with the text. These can be titles for children or young adults, but illustrations have to make up at least half of the content, and these illustrations must be original, not compiled from other sources. , winners receive a prize of $7,500, split evenly between the author and the illustrator.

"Picture Book" is the only category to be included in every awards ceremony, and was first presented in 1982 as "Picture Book of the Year" in the New Zealand Government Publishing Awards. There were no awards ceremonies in 1989, but the category was resurrected in the first AIM Children's Book Awards in 1990 as "Picture Book", and has retained the name to this day.

Picture Book of the Year (1982–8); Picture Book (1990–)

Non-fiction
The Non-fiction category is for titles in "which present well-authenticated data, with consideration given to imaginative presentation, interpretation and style". Titles for children or young adults can be included in this category, but not textbooks, resource kits, poetry, folklore, or retellings of myths and legends. , winners in the Non-fiction category receive a prize of $7,500.

The Non Fiction category was added in 1986 to the New Zealand Government Publishing Awards, but removed again in 1987. The category was not resurrected until 1993, as part of the AIM Children's Book Awards. From 2008, the category's name has been hyphenated.

Non Fiction (1986, 1993–2007); Non-fiction (2008–)

Fiction
The Fiction category is for works of creative writing, in which the text constitutes the "heart of the book". The category was added with the creation of the AIM Children's Book Awards in 1990, but was split into Junior Fiction and Senior Fiction in 1993. The name of the Senior Fiction category was later to change to Young Adult Fiction in 2004.

, winners in either Fiction category receive a prize of $7,500.

Winners of the Fiction category in 1990 to 1992, when there was no Book of the Year award and the only additional category was Picture Book (and Best First Book in 1992), have been considered Book of the Year winners.

Junior Fiction
Created in 1993, this award is for works in the Fiction category whose intended audience are in Years 1–8 (primary and intermediate school) (See ).

Young Adult Fiction
Created in 1993, and called Senior Fiction prior to 2004, this award is for works in the Fiction category whose intended audience are in Years 9–13 (secondary school).

Senior Fiction (1993–2003); Young Adult Fiction (2004–)

Honour Award and runners-up
Honour Awards are given at the judge's discretion to outstanding finalists that don't win in their category. , finalists presented an Honour Award receive a prize of $500.

Honour Awards were first presented in 1993, while in 1990 to 1992 runners-up were awarded second and third prizes.

Second Prize (1990–2); Honour Award (1993–)

See also
Ockham New Zealand Book Awards
Esther Glen Award
Margaret Mahy Award
Joy Cowley Award
List of New Zealand literary awards

References

External links

New Zealand Post Book Awards for Children and Young Adults at the Christchurch City Libraries website
New Zealand Post Book Awards for Children and Young Adults at the New Zealand Book Council website

New Zealand children's literary awards
Young adult literature awards